Hyaleucerea manicorensis is a moth of the subfamily Arctiinae. It was described by Rego Barros in 1971. It is found in Brazil.

References

Euchromiina
Moths described in 1971